Silver Creek Reservoir  also known as Silverton Reservoir is a  impoundment on Silver Creek located in the Cascade foothills  southeast of the city of Silverton, Oregon, United States on Oregon Route 214. The reservoir serves the purpose of flood control on the creek.

The lake is popular in the spring and summer as a recreation area. Stocked with roughly 20,000 hatchery trout each spring and early summer, the lake also provides opportunities to catch bullhead catfish. Swimming is also quite popular on warm summer days as well as recreational boating, though no gas motors are allowed on the lake.

Since the reservoir was created in 1960, there has been fear in Silverton that Silver Creek Dam might someday give way. Though structural engineers have declared the dam safe and deemed the conditions for a dam breach to be almost out of the realm of possibility, US Army Corps of Engineers studies have found that a collapse of the dam would be catastrophic to the city below.

See also 
 List of lakes in Oregon

References

Reservoirs in Oregon
Silverton, Oregon
Rivers of Marion County, Oregon
Tourist attractions in Marion County, Oregon
Buildings and structures in Marion County, Oregon
Protected areas of Marion County, Oregon
1960 establishments in Oregon